San Rocco a Pilli is a town in Tuscany, central Italy, administratively a frazione of the comune of Sovicille, province of Siena. At the time of the 2001 census its population was 2,288.

History 
The discovery of objects of Etruscan and Roman origins demonstrates how the area where the town is located has been inhabited since ancient times.

Sports 
Tuscany Camp, an elite athletics training camp that hosts many Ugandan and Burundian athletes, is based in San Rocco a Pilli.

References 

Frazioni of Sovicille